On 15 July 1960, at 09:04, Ethiopian Air Lines Flight 372, a C-47 Skytrain registered as ET-T-18, took off from Bulki, Ethiopia, on a short-haul flight to Aba Segud Airport, Jimma, Ethiopia. There were eight passengers, three crew and a cargo of coffee on board. At 09:40, the pilot requested the activation of the Jimma non-directional beacon (NDB) to assist his navigation. There was no further contact with the flight. The aircraft was damaged beyond repair.

Cause
It was determined that the accident was caused by the following:
1. The pilot misjudged the weather conditions, in that he continued to fly into deteriorating weather conditions while trying to maintain visual flight rules.
2. The pilot misjudged the performance capabilities of the aircraft, in that he attempted to climb at a speed below the minimum safe climbing speed of the aircraft.

References

372
Aviation accidents and incidents in 1960
Aviation accidents and incidents in Ethiopia
1960 in Ethiopia
July 1960 events in Africa
Accidents and incidents involving the Douglas C-47 Skytrain
1960 disasters in Ethiopia